In My Dreams may refer to:

Film
 In My Dreams (film), a 2014 television film

Music

Albums 
 In My Dreams (Daryl Coley album) or the title song, 1994
 In My Dreams (Judith Lefeber album), 2003
 In My Dreams (Military Wives album) or the title song, 2012
 In My Dreams (Rick Trevino album) or the title song, 2003

Songs 
 "In My Dreams" (Dokken song), 1986
 "In My Dreams" (Emmylou Harris song), 1984
 "In My Dreams" (REO Speedwagon song), 1987
 "In My Dreams" (Wig Wam song), 2004
 "In My Dreams!", by the Aquabats from Hi-Five Soup!, 2011
 "In My Dreams", by Berlin from Love Life, 1984
 "In My Dreams", by Crosby, Stills & Nash from CSN, 1977
 "In My Dreams", by Danny L Harle, 2014
 "In My Dreams", by Dark Funeral from Angelus Exuro pro Eternus, 2009
 "In My Dreams", by DJ Antoine, 2009
 "In My Dreams", by Dream  from It Was All a Dream, 2001
 "In My Dreams", by Eels from Hombre Lobo, 2009
 "In My Dreams", by James Morrison from The Awakening, 2011
 "In My Dreams", by Josh Turner from Long Black Train, 2003
 "In My Dreams", by Kali Uchis from Isolation, 2018
 "In My Dreams", by Lionel Richie from Just for You, 2004
 "In My Dreams", by Pat Benatar from Go, 2003
 "In My Dreams", by Tonight Alive from Underworld, 2018
 "In My Dreams", by Will Downing, 1988
 "In My Dreams", from the musical Anastasia, 2016
 "In My Dreams (Cudder Anthem)", by Kid Cudi from Man on the Moon: The End of Day, 2009

See also
 In Dreams (disambiguation)
 "In My Dream (With Shiver)", a 1993 song by Luna Sea
 "In My Dream", a song by Super Junior from Bonamana, 2010
 In Your Dreams (disambiguation)
 Only in My Dreams (disambiguation)